Ernest John Rowarth (28 June 1926 – 15 December 2004) was an Australian rules footballer who played with Melbourne in the Victorian Football League (VFL).

Notes

External links 

Ern Rowarth at Demonwiki

1926 births
Australian rules footballers from Victoria (Australia)
Melbourne Football Club players
2004 deaths